Ali Aliyev may refer to:

Ali Aliev (physicist) (born 1955), American and Uzbekistani physicist of Crimean Tatar descent.
Ali Aliyev (boxer) (born 1983), Russian amateur boxer
Ali Aliyev (footballer) (born 1980), Kazakh footballer
Ali Aliyev (wrestler) (1937–1995), Soviet wrestler